The Motorised Brigade, formerly the  Medium Brigade, is a Brigade of the Land Component of the Belgian Armed Forces commanded by Kolonel Lieven Geeraert. Its headquarters is located in Leopoldsburg and Marche-en-Famenne

After World War II, the unit was known as the Brigade Bevrijding, 1er Groupement d'Infanterie and finally as the 1re Brigade d'Infanterie, later the 1re Brigade d'Infanterie Blindée. The brigade consists of 5 manoeuvre battalions.

Equipment: In the future, the brigade will be equipped with various motorised vehicles, including                                                                                             44x pandur I, 382x  VBMR griffon, 60x EBRC Jaguar and hundreds of Oskosch command and liaison vehicles. The artillery battalion will have 28 155mm self-propelled howitzers. 

Future organisation: the combat capacity of the brigade will be reorganized around 4 infantry battalions and 2 cavalry battalions. The artillery battalion is to have an anti-aircraft battery.

Structure 

 Motorized Brigade, in Leopoldsburg
 Headquarters and Staff Company, carrying the traditions of the 8th/9th Regiment of the Line, in Leopoldsburg
 Combat units: 
 1/3rd Lancers Battalion, in Marche-en-Famenne with Piranha IIIC and ATF Dingo 2 wheeled, armored vehicles (to be replaced by VBMR Griffons)
 Battalion Carabiniers "Prins Boudewijn" - Grenadiers, in Leopoldsburg with Piranha IIIC and ATF Dingo 2 wheeled, armored vehicles (to be replaced by VBMR Griffons)
 Battalion "Bevrijding" - 5th of the Line, in Leopoldsburg with Piranha IIIC and ATF Dingo 2 wheeled, armored vehicles (to be replaced by VBMR Griffons)
 Battalion "Chasseurs Ardennais", in Marche-en-Famenne with Piranha IIIC and ATF Dingo 2 wheeled, armored vehicles (to be replaced by VBMR Griffons)
 Battalion 12th of the Line "Prince Léopold" - 13th of the Line, in Spa (Light infantry)
 Combat support units: 
 Artillery Battalion, in Brasschaat
 Mortar Battery, with 120mm mortars
 Howitzer Battery, with LG1 105mm howitzers
 4th Engineer Battalion, in Amay
 11th Engineer Battalion, in Zwijndrecht
 Jagers te Paard Battalion ( ISTAR ), in Heverlee with Pandur I reconnaissance vehicles. 
 Combat service support units: 
 4th Communication and Information Systems Group, in Marche-en-Famenne
 10th Communication and Information Systems Group, in Leopoldsburg
 4th Logistics Battalion, in Marche-en-Famenne
 18th Logistics Battalion, in Leopoldsburg
 Training units: 
 Training Camp Beverlo, near Leopoldsburg
 Training Camp Marche, near Marche-en-Famenne

References

Medium Brigade